Utetheisa elata is a moth in the family Erebidae. It was described by Johan Christian Fabricius in 1798. It is found in Angola, South Africa and Tanzania, as well as on the Comoros, Réunion, Madagascar, Mauritius and the Seychelles.

The larvae have been recorded feeding on Tournefortia argentea, Heliotropium amplexicaule, Trichodesma zeylanicum, Heliotropium indicum, Tournefortia sarmentosa, Crotalaria juncea and Crotalaria striata.

Subspecies
Utetheisa elata elata
Utetheisa elata fatua (Heyn, 1906)
Utetheisa elata fatela Jordan, 1939

References

Moths described in 1798
elata